Vaida Genytė-Marazienė (born 29 November 1974) is a Lithuanian singer (soprano), TV host and music teacher.

Biography 
Genytė was born in Panevėžys, but after a week with her parents moved to Anykščiai. She lived here for 3 years, after which she went to Molėtai where she grew up.

In 1980, Genytė became a "Dainų dainelė" laureate for the song "Čiunga čianga". From 1981-1992, studied and graduated from Molėtai Gymnasium. From 1992 to 1995, she studied at Panevėžys Conservatory, acquiring the specialty of music teacher.

In 2008, Genytė along with Alanas Chošnau participated in LNK musical show "Star Duets 2" (won the second place), LRT musical project "Arc de Triomphe". From 2008 to 2012, she hosted LTV wired "Millennium Children". From January–May 2010, she and Kastytis Barisas participated in the LNK musical show "Star Duets 4", reaching the semifinals with the choir "Ave Vita".

Genytė is married to Aidas Marazas and they have a son Ainis.

Theatrical activity 
"Žmogus iš La Mančos" (Lithuanian National Drama Theatre).

References 

1974 births
Living people
Lithuanian sopranos
People from Panevėžys
21st-century Lithuanian women singers
Lithuanian women television presenters